Jessica Kagan Cushman is an independent jewelry and accessories designer.

Early life
Cushman was born on April 7, 1958 in New York City. Her father, Vladimir Kagan, was a German-born furniture designer considered an early pioneer of modern American design. Her mother, Erica Wilson, was an innovative British embroidery designer who was known as “the Julia Child of needlework.” Cushman graduated from Smith College with a BA in Art History. She resides in Redding, Connecticut, with her husband Bill Cushman.

Career

Jewelry and accessories
After learning scrimshaw from her father and embroidery from her mother, Cushman went into business in 2004, starting out with hand-engraved bracelets. She has since expanded her line to include necklaces, rings, earrings and other accessories. Her items have been featured on the cover of Cosmopolitan, and in numerous other magazines, such as Vogue (UK), Elle, People and InStyle.

Inscribed bracelets
In 2007, Cushman began hand-engraving fossilized woolly mammoth tusk bangles with whimsical pop culture sayings. Barneys New York was the first store to offer the line. Cushman then began manufacturing a more affordable resin reproduction version. Two years later, Cushman introduced a line of tote bags inscribed with similar phrases, as well as cuffs featuring zodiac constellations in crystals on black resin.

Honors
In 2012, Cushman was named one of three rising star finalists by Fashion Group International in the category of fine jewelry.

References

External links
 Official website
 Company website

Living people
American jewelry designers
1958 births
Artists from New York City
People from Redding, Connecticut
Women jewellers